The following articles list politicians from various conservative parties:

Canada
List of Canadian conservative leaders

European Union
List of European Conservatives and Reformists members of the European Parliament

United Kingdom
Leader of the Conservative Party (UK)
Deputy Leader of the Conservative Party (UK)
Chief Whip of the Conservative Party
List of Conservative Party (UK) MPs
List of Conservative Party Members of Parliament in London
List of United Kingdom Conservative MPs (2005–10)
List of United Kingdom Conservative MPs (2010–15)
:Category:Conservative Party (UK) politicians

See also 
 Conservative Party (disambiguation)
 European Conservatives and Reformists